The Living Planet: Music from the BBC TV Series is the soundtrack album to the television series The Living Planet. It was written and recorded by Elizabeth Parker at the BBC Radiophonic Workshop. It was reissued by Silva Screen on CD and digital download 12 August 2016 and on pearl-coloured vinyl LP on 26 August 2016.

Track listing 
The Living Planet (Theme from the series)
The Building of the Earth
The Frozen World
The Northern Forests
Jungle
Seas of Grass
The Baking Deserts
The Sky Above
Sweet Fresh Water
The Margins of the Land
Worlds Apart
The Open Ocean
New Worlds (Closing Theme from the Series)

References

External links
Album information

BBC Radiophonic Workshop albums
1984 soundtrack albums
Television soundtracks
Electronic soundtracks
BBC Records soundtracks